John Papillon (30 December 1806 – 20 October 1889) was an English cleric, and a cricketer with amateur status. He was associated with Oxford University and made his first-class debut in 1827.

Papillon was educated at Winchester College and then at University College, Oxford, where he matriculated in 1825, and graduated B.A. in 1828. He became a Church of England priest and was rector of Bonnington, Kent, 1831–41 and of Lexden, Essex, from 1841 until his death.

References

1806 births
1889 deaths
English cricketers
English cricketers of 1826 to 1863
Oxford University cricketers
Alumni of University College, Oxford
19th-century English Anglican priests